2K12 may refer to:

 the year 2012
 2K12 Kub, Soviet air defense system
 Major League Baseball 2K12, 2012 video game
 NBA 2K12, 2011 video game